Henry Ustick Onderdonk (March 16, 1789 – December 6, 1858) was the second Episcopal bishop of Pennsylvania.

Early life
Onderdonk was born in New York City.  He studied at Columbia University, receiving his degree in 1805, and then traveled to Britain for further education, receiving his medical degree from the University of Edinburgh.  On returning to the United States, Onderdonk practiced medicine in New York before being ordained to the deaconate and priesthood by Bishop John Henry Hobart.  In 1816, he went to western New York as a missionary and then returned east to become rector of St. Ann's Church in Brooklyn, remaining there for seven years.

Bishop of Pennsylvania
Onderdonk was elected assistant bishop of Pennsylvania in 1827, serving initially as assistant to Bishop William White.  He was the 21st bishop of the ECUSA, and was consecrated by bishops William White, Alexander Viets Griswold, and James Kemp. However, bishop Kemp died of injuries received in a stage coach accident while returning from the consecration, so Onderdonk substituted in the Episcopal Diocese of Maryland until a successor was elected. In 1830, Onderdonk published Episcopacy Tested In Scripture, first published in the Protestant Episcopalian and then as tract by the Protestant Episcopal Tract Society, a defense of episcopacy based "on an appeal to the bible alone."

On Bishop White's death in 1836, Onderdonk succeeded him as bishop.  Onderdonk was a strong advocate of the pre-Tractarian High Church position, in company with his brother Benjamin Treadwell Onderdonk, who was also a bishop. When Rev. Alexander Crummell petitioned to be allowed to move to Pennsylvania to establish another church (besides the peripatetic St. Thomas congregation) to serve Philadelphia's African-American community, Bishop Onderdonk reportedly replied, "I will receive you into this diocese on one condition: No negro priest can sit in my church convention and no negro church must ask for representation there." Crummell reportedly paused for a moment before declining.

In 1844, Onderdonk was suspended from the exercise of his episcopal office after rumors of alcoholism. The suspension was lifted in 1856, two years before his death.

He is buried in the churchyard of Church of St. James the Less in Philadelphia.

Notes

References
 
 The Episcopate in America, by William Stevens Perry

External links
 Documents by Onderdonk from Project Canterbury

1789 births
1858 deaths
American people of Dutch descent
Columbia College (New York) alumni
Alumni of the University of Edinburgh
19th-century Anglican bishops in the United States
Burials at the Church of St. James the Less
Clergy from New York City
Episcopal bishops of Pennsylvania
Episcopal bishops of Delaware
18th-century Anglican theologians
19th-century Anglican theologians